The Columbus University, is an institution of higher education, established on October 12, 1992. It is authorized by the Panamanian Ministry of Education. It is recognized as a private university, by the Panamanian State, through Executive Decree (in Spanish, Decreto Ejecutivo) No. 112, dated February 25, 1994 and published in the Official Gazette (in Spanish, Gaceta Official) No. 22-492 of March 11, 1994.
All its academic programs are approved by the State Universities responsible for its operation: Universidad de Panamá (University of Panama) and Universidad Tecnológica de Panamá (Technological University of Panama).

At present it comprises the following faculties:

 Medicine and Health Sciences
 Administrative Sciences, Economics and Business
 Education Sciences and Linguistics
 Marine Sciences and Technology
 Natural Sciences and Architecture
 Social Sciences and Information Technology
 Law and Political Sciences

External links
 Official page

Universities in Panama
Educational institutions established in 1992
1992 establishments in Panama